is the 12th studio album by a Japanese singer-songwriter Yosui Inoue, released in December 1984. It mostly features cover versions of the songs that Inoue wrote for other performers, except "Isso Serenade" which was released as a lead single in October 1984. It is the most commercially successful album for him, its sales are estimated to be 1.1-1.8 million copies.

Album overview

Songs information
In addition to "Isso Serenade" which became Inoue's third top-ten hit single as a singer, 9.5 Carats also includes his own rendition of four of his successful compositions around the early 1980s. One of them, "Wine Red no Kokoro" was originally recorded by Inoue's former backing band Anzen Chitai and co-written by the group's frontman Koji Tamaki. A song that Inoue contributed the lyrics was released as a single in 1983, and topped the Japanese Oricon chart in the following year. The band rose to fame owing to the hit of "Wine Red no Kokoro", and the song itself won the 26th Japan Record Award for "Gold Prize". It has been one of the signature songs for both Inoue and Anzen Chitai, and recorded by the multiple artists including Mariko Takahashi, Junko Ohashi, Naoko Ken, Kiyotaka Sugiyama, Mucc, Megumi Ogata, Park Yong-ha, and the song's composer himself (on his 1999 same-titled album). Inoue also wrote the lyrics for some of the group's successful follow-ups to "Wine Red no Kokoro", including "Koi no Yokan" which reached the #2 on the chart in autumn 1984. Also in the same year, he composed the song "Kazari ja Nai no yo Namida wa" for a pop icon Akina Nakamori who was at the pinnacle of popularity at the time. Nakamori's version was issued as a single in November 1984 and topped the chart, becoming one of her biggest hit singles with sales of over 620,000 copies. Nakamori remade the song for several times in later years, and also covered two of other Inoue's compositions on 9.5 Carats album ("Koi no Yokan" and "Dance wa Umaku Odorenai"). Before Inoue married to a singer Seri Ishikawa in 1978, he contributed some songs for her 1977 album Amagumo. One of them "Dance wa Umaku Odorenai" was not successful at the time, but the song was widely recognized because of cover version by an actress Mio Takaki. It was featured on the TV drama Kako no Nai On-na Tachi and became a hit, peaking at #3 on the chart in 1982. Like "Winered no Kokoro", "Dance wa Umaku Odorenai" has been covered by several other singers, including Naoko Ken and Hideaki Tokunaga.

Reception
9.5 Carats gained commercial success immediately upon its release, becoming his first chart-topper since 1976 Shoutaijou no Nai Show and most massively successful LP after his breakthrough album Kōri no Sekai issued in 1973. The album debuted at the summit of the Japanese Oricon chart, and stayed there for 9 weeks consecutively. It sold in excess of 1.1 million copies while the album was entering the chart, and eventually became the 1985's biggest selling album in Japan. In the history of the Japanese music industry, it is also one of the best-selling albums by male solo artist during the 1980s, along with Akira Terao's Reflections (released in 1981 and sold over 1.6 million copies to date), Eiichi Otaki's A Long Vacation (released in 1981 and retailed approximately 1.08 million copies) and Michael Jackson's Thriller (released in 1982 and estimated to be selling between 1.7 and 2.5 million units so far).

Track listing

Personnel
The following session musicians were credited in the liner notes for box-set No Selection, released in 1991.
Yosui Inoue - vocals
Yutaka Uehara - drums
Takayuki Hijikata - guitar
Ken Yajima - guitar
Yutaka Takezawa - guitar
Fujimal Yoshino - guitar
Yūji Nakamura - bass guitar
Kenji Takamizu - bass guitar
Yasuharu Nakanishi - keyboards
Jun Satou - keyboards
Joe Hisaishi - synthesizer
Hidefumi Toki - synthesizer
Yūji Kawashima - synthesizer
Masatsugu Shinozaki - violin
Ohno Group - strings
Katou Strings - strings

Charts

Weekly charts

Year-end charts

Decade-end charts

Release history

References

Yōsui Inoue albums
1984 albums
Self-covers albums